Road 400 (Cottonwood Canyon Road)  is a scenic  dirt road in Kane County, Utah, United States that connects U.S. Route 89 (US-89) with South Kodachrome Road (which, within a few more miles connects with Cannonville and Utah State Route 12). The road traverses portions of Grand Staircase–Escalante National Monument offering a unique view into the heart of the Monument.  
This road is considered impassable in wet weather and high clearance vehicles are recommended.

Views
Patient drivers of this road will be rewarded with a closer look at spectacular natural features, including one known as the Cockscomb. Topography here is on a more intimate scale, and formations are varied and colorful.  Additionally there are notable hiking trails accessed along the route such as Hackberry Canyon, the Cottonwood Narrows, and Round Valley Draw.  Other attractions located on the northern end of the road include Grosvenor Arch and Kodachrome Basin State Park, more reliably accessed from Cannonville.

Road condition
The road was originally constructed as a maintenance road for power lines following the canyon.

During dry weather road 400 is a reasonably good quality dirt road (mostly sand and clay over a sandstone foundation). If the road has been recently graded it may be suitable for passenger cars, however high clearance vehicles are recommended.

It is considered impassable in wet weather. Many sections traverse ancient seabed deposits of mudstone, silt, and shale.  When wet the clay surface becomes exceptionally slick, even four wheel drive is rendered useless. Additionally many drainages cross the road in various locations, and these may wash out during periodic flash flooding, particularly during summer thunderstorms. Even in dry weather the road can be muddy to the point of being impassable in low areas.

There are no services available along the route except at Cannonville on the northern end. It is recommended to carry food, extra water, and emergency supplies before traveling this road. This route should be avoided if significant rain or accumulating snow are in the forecast, and always check road conditions at one of the various BLM offices in the region before setting out.

Termini
The southern terminus is at the junction with US-89 in Kane County: 
The northern terminus is at Kane County line near Cannonville, where it becomes South Kodachrome Road:

References

External links
 
 USA-Reporter.com Actual road conditions of 23 backroads at GSENM including CCR. Abstract in German, complete version as pdf in English

Roads in Utah
Transportation in Kane County, Utah